Coleophora arenifera is a moth of the family Coleophoridae that is endemic to Kazakhstan.

The larvae feed on Artemisia terrae-albae. They feed on the leaves of their host plant.

References

External links

arenifera
Moths described in 1989
Moths of Asia
Endemic fauna of Kazakhstan